Indirect elections were held for the presidency and vice-presidency of the government of the Republic of China on Taiwan on March 21, 1966. The vote took place at the Chung-Shan Hall in Taipei. Incumbent President Chiang Kai-shek was re-elected for the fourth term with his Vice-President Yen Chia-kan.

The amendment of the Temporary Provisions against the Communist Rebellion in 1960 had allowed Chiang Kai-shek to seek for unlimited terms. After the death of Vice-President Chen Cheng in 1965. Chiang decided to pick premier Yen Chia-kan to be his running-mate, filling the vacancy. In the end, Yen was elected by a narrow majority, 55 per cent of the votes, while Chiang received 98 per cent of the votes.

Electors

The election was conducted by the National Assembly in its meeting place Chung-Shan Hall in Taipei. According to the Temporary Provisions against the Communist Rebellion, the term of the delegates who were elected during the 1947 Chinese National Assembly election was extended indefinitely until "re-election is possible in their original electoral district". In total, there were 1,446 delegates reported to the secretariat to attend this fourth session of the first National Assembly.

Results

President

Vice president

See also
History of Republic of China
President of the Republic of China
Vice President of the Republic of China

References

Presidential elections in Taiwan
1966 in Taiwan
Taiwan